The Law of Property (Miscellaneous Provisions) Act 1989 (c 34) is a United Kingdom Act of Parliament, which laid down a number of significant revisions to English property law.

Nature of reforms

The Act introduced several distinct reforms:

 The common law rules governing the form and delivery of a deed were abolished, and were replaced by requirements that:
 a deed is valid only when expressed as such,
 it is either signed by an individual in the presence of a witness who attests to it, or at his direction and attested by two witnesses, and
 it is delivered as a deed by him or a person authorised to do so on his behalf.

 Contracts for the sale or other disposition of an interest in land must be made in writing, and they must incorporate all agreed terms in one document.

 The rule of law known as the rule in Bain v. Fothergill  (where, in an action for breach of contract for the sale of land because of failure of title without fraud, the plaintiff may recover his expenses but not consequential damages for loss of the benefit of the bargain) was abolished. In registered land since the Land Registration Act 2002 such actions no longer occur due to the guarantee of title of the Land Registry where no fraud has been carried out or contributed to by the seller/transferor. In unregistered land (less than 16% of land) it is the policy that as in other areas of law the purchaser/recipient of land, entitled to good title, should be compensated as the court sees fit, subject to specific binding precedent decisions, without such an absolute bar on damages.

Subsequent jurisprudence

Validity of execution under Mercury
S. 1(3) of the Act provides that:

In its 2008 decision in the Mercury Tax Group case, the High Court of England and Wales expressed in obiter that the recycling of signature pages from earlier drafts rendered the agreements in question invalid as deeds under the Act. Taken together with previous jurisprudence on the execution of documents in the Court of Appeal for England and Wales, the Law Society of England and Wales has issued guidance as to what steps are necessary in order to validly execute deeds and other documents executed in counterpart in electronic or virtual signings or closings:

Land contracts covered by the Act
Section 2 deals with contracts for the creation or sale of legal estates or interests in land, and not with documents that transfer such estates or interests. The required scope for such contracts is defined in s. 2:

The Court of Appeal has noted which types of agreements fall either within the Act or outside of it:

The "single document" requirement is strictly applied:

The Court has given guidance on circumstances where a land contract can be avoided under s. 2:

A party seeking to avoid must identify a term which the parties have expressly agreed, which is not to be found in the single, or exchanged, signed document.
It is not sufficient merely to show that the land contract formed part of a larger transaction which was subject to other expressly agreed terms which are absent from the land contract.
The expressly agreed term must, if it is required by section 2 to be included in the single document, be a term of the sale of the land, rather than a term of some simultaneous contract (whether for the sale of a chattel or the provision of a service) which happens to take place at the same time as the land contract, and to form part of one commercial transaction.
S. 2(1) does not prohibit parties from structuring a transaction, for example, for the sale of the whole of a company's assets, in such a way that the land sale is dealt with in a different document from the sale of stock, work in progress or goodwill, unless the sale of the land is conditional upon the sale of the other assets.

Proprietary estoppel
S. 2 of the Act repealed s. 40 of the Law of Property Act 1925, thus abolishing the equitable doctrine of part performance with respect to dispositions of interests in land, which had been recommended by the Law Commission of England and Wales. Although the Commission believed that the equitable doctrines of promissory estoppel and proprietary estoppel would still be available to provide relief, the House of Lords has subsequently held that such relief was not available. As Lord Scott of Foscote stated in his speech:

This mirrors the observation that "The doctrine of estoppel may not be invoked to render valid a transaction which the legislature has, on grounds of general public policy, enacted is to be invalid," which has been cited in other cases in the matter by the Court of Appeal. The constructive trust remedy that is available under s. 2(5) of the Act, however, operates under principles distinct from those of estoppel, which can lead to problems in application and enforcement. Academic discussion suggests that estoppel may still be available in situations outside of s. 2 on its own terms.

Further reading

See also
English property law
English contract law

References

English property law
United Kingdom Acts of Parliament 1989
English contract law